ONE 158: Tawanchai vs. Larsen was a combat sports event produced by ONE Championship that took place on June 3, 2022, at the Singapore Indoor Stadium in Kallang, Singapore.

Background
A ONE Strawweight Championship bout between current two-time champion Joshua Pacio and Jarred Brooks was originally expected to headline the event. However, Brooks withdrew with injury. They are now to headline at ONE 164 on December 3. A featherweight muay thai bout between Tawanchai P.K.Saenchai and Niclas Larsen was promoted to the main event status.

In the co-main event, a bantamweight bout between Kwon Won Il and Fabrício Andrade took place at the event, who is next for a ONE bantamweight title.

A heavyweight kickboxing bout between Rade Opačić and Guto Inocente took place at this event. The pairing was previously scheduled to meet at ONE 157, but the bout was postponed to this event due to Inocente tested positive for COVID-19.

Results

Bonus awards
The following fighters were awarded bonuses:

 $50,000 Performance of the Night: Alex Silva, Fabricio Andrade and Tawanchai P.K.Saenchai

See also 

 2022 in ONE Championship
 List of ONE Championship events
 List of current ONE fighters

References 

Events in Singapore
ONE Championship events
2022 in mixed martial arts
Mixed martial arts in Singapore
Sports competitions in Singapore
June 2022 sports events in Singapore